Madhavaram may refer to:

Places in South India

Andhra Pradesh
 Madhavaram, Kukkunoor, a village in Kukkunoor Taluk, Eluru district
 Madhavaram, Tadepalligudem, a village in Tadepalligudem mandal, West Godavari district
 Madhavaram, Prakasam, a village in Thallur Taluk, Prakasam district
 Madhavaram, Vontimitta, a village in Vontimitta Taluk, Kadapa district
 Madhavaram, Rayachoti, a village in Rayachoti Taluk, Annamayya district
 Madhavaram, Mantralayam, a village in Mantralayam Taluk, Kurnool district
 Madhavaram, Peapally, a village in Peapally Taluk, Nandyal district
 Madhavaram, Thavanampalle, a village in Thavanampalle Taluk, Chittoor district
 Madhavaram, Yadamari, a village in Yadamarri Taluk, Chittoor district
 Madhavaram (West), a village in A.Konduru mandal, NTR district
 Madhavaram (East), a village in A.Konduru mandal, NTR district
 Madhavaram, Mudinepalle, a village in Mudinepalli Taluk, Krishna district
 Cheruvu Madhavaram, a village in G. Konduru mandal, Krishna district

Tamil Nadu
 Madhavaram, Chennai, is a part of north of Chennai, Tamil Nadu, India.
 Madhavaram Milk Colony
 Madhavaram Botanical Garden
 Madhavaram taluk
 Madhavaram Inter-city Bus Terminus
 Madhavaram Junction
 Madhavaram Lake
 Madhavaram (state assembly constituency)
 Madhavaram, Gummidipoondi, a village in Gummidipoondi Taluk, Thiruvallur district
 Madhavaram, Ponneri, a village in Ponneri Taluk, Thiruvallur district

Telangana
 Madhavaram, Telangana, a village in Munagala Taluk, Suryapeta district

People
 Madhavaram Krishna Rao, Indian politician